Dyspareunia is painful sexual intercourse due to medical or psychological causes. The term dyspareunia covers both female dyspareunia and male dyspareunia, but many discussions that use the term without further specification concern the female type, which is more common than the male type. In females, the pain can primarily be on the external surface of the genitalia, or deeper in the pelvis upon deep pressure against the cervix. Medically, dyspareunia is a pelvic floor dysfunction and is frequently underdiagnosed. It can affect a small portion of the vulva or vagina or be felt all over the surface. Understanding the duration, location, and nature of the pain is important in identifying the causes of the pain.

Numerous physical, psychological, and social or relationship causes can contribute to pain during sexual encounters. Commonly, multiple underlying causes contribute to the pain. The pain can be acquired or congenital. Symptoms of dyspareunia may also occur after menopause. Diagnosis is typically by physical examination and medical history.

Underlying causes determine treatment. Many patients experience relief when physical causes are identified and treated.

In 2020, dyspareunia has been estimated to globally affect 35% of women at some point in their lives.

Signs and symptoms 
Those who experience pelvic pain upon attempted vaginal intercourse describe their pain in many ways. This reflects how many different and overlapping causes there are for dyspareunia. The location, nature, and time course of the pain help to understand potential causes and treatments.

Some describe superficial pain at the opening of the vagina or surface of the genitalia when penetration is initiated. Others feel deeper pain in the vault of the vagina or deep within the pelvis upon deeper penetration. Some feel pain in more than one of these places. Determining whether the pain is more superficial or deep is important in understanding what may be causing the pain. Some patients have always experienced pain with intercourse from their very first attempt, while others begin to feel pain with intercourse after an injury or infection or cyclically with menstruation. Sometimes the pain increases over time.

Pain may distract from feeling pleasure and excitement. Both vaginal lubrication and vaginal dilation decrease. When the vagina is dry and undilated, penetration is more painful.  Fear of being in pain can make the discomfort worse. Pain may continue despite the original source being removed, due to the learned expectation of pain. Fear, avoidance, and psychological distress around attempting intercourse can become large parts of the experience of dyspareunia.

Physical examination of the vulva (external genitalia) may reveal clear reasons for pain including lesions, thin skin, ulcerations or discharge associated with vulvovaginal infections or vaginal atrophy. An internal pelvic exam may also reveal physical reasons for pain including lesions on the cervix or anatomic variation.

When there are no visible findings on vulvar exam that would suggest a cause for superficial dyspareunia, a cotton-swab test may be performed. This is a test to assess for localized provoked vulvodynia. A cotton tip applicator is applied at several points around the opening of the vagina; the patient reports the resulting pain on a scale from 0–10.

Causes

Vaginal 
The cause of the pain may be anatomic or physiologic, including but not limited to lesions of the vagina, retroversion of the uterus, urinary tract infection, lack of lubrication, scar tissue, abnormal growths, or tender pelvic sites. Some cases may be psychosomatic, which can include fear of pain or injury, feelings of guilt or shame, ignorance of sexual anatomy and physiology, and fear of pregnancy.

Common causes for discomfort on vaginal penetration include:
 Infections.  Infections that mostly affect the labia, vagina, or lower urinary tract like yeast infections, chlamydia, trichomoniasis, urinary tract infections, or herpes tend to cause more superficial pain. Infections of the cervix, or fallopian tubes like pelvic inflammatory disease tend to cause deeper pain.
 Cancer of the reproductive tract, including the ovaries, cervix, uterus, or vagina.
 Tissue Injury. Pain after trauma to the pelvis from injury, surgery or childbirth.
 Anatomic variations. Hymenal remnants, vaginal septa, thickened undilatable hymen, hypoplasia of the introitus, retroverted uterus or uterine prolapse can contribute to discomfort.
 Hormonal causes:
 Endometriosis and adenomyosis
 Estrogen deficiency is a particularly common cause of sexual pain complaints related to vaginal atrophy among postmenopausal patients, and may be a result of similar changes in menstruating patients on hormonal birth control. Estrogen deficiency is associated with lubrication inadequacy, which can lead to painful friction during intercourse. Vaginal dryness is often also reported alongside lactation. Patients undergoing radiation therapy for pelvic malignancy often experience severe dyspareunia due to the atrophy of the vaginal walls and their susceptibility to trauma.
 Pelvic masses, including ovarian cysts, tumors, and uterine fibroids can cause deep pain.
 Pain from bladder irritation: Dyspareunia is a symptom of interstitial cystitis (IC). Patients may struggle with bladder pain and discomfort during or after sex. For an IC patient with a penis, pain occurs at the moment of ejaculation and is focused at the tip of the penis. If the IC patient has a vagina, pain usually occurs the following day and is the result of painful, spasming pelvic floor muscles. Interstitial cystitis patients also struggle with urinary frequency and/or urinary urgency.
 Vulvodynia: Vulvodynia is a diagnosis of exclusion involving either generalized or localized vulvar pain most often described as burning without physical evidence of other causes on exam. Pain can be constant or only when provoked (as with intercourse). Localized provoked vulvodynia is the most recent terminology for what used to be called vulvar vestibulitis when the pain is localized to the vaginal opening.
 Conditions that affect the surface of the vulva including LSEA (lichen sclerosus et atrophicus), or xerosis (dryness, especially after the menopause). Vaginal dryness is sometimes seen in Sjögren's syndrome, an autoimmune disorder that characteristically attacks the exocrine glands that produce saliva and tears.
 Muscular dysfunction: For example, levator ani myalgia
 Psychological, such as vaginismus. Most vaginal pain disorders were officially discovered or coined during a time when rape was more normalized than it is now (marital rape was only recognized as non-consensual by all 50 US states in 1993). Some in the medical community are now starting to take into account factors like rape/sexual assault/ fear of rape/sexual harassment as strong enough psychological stressors to cause such pain disorders.

Testicular and Penile 
There are a number of physical factors that may cause sexual discomfort. Pain is sometimes experienced in the testicular or glans area of the penis immediately after ejaculation. Infections of the prostate, bladder, or seminal vesicles can lead to intense burning or itching sensations following ejaculation. Patients with interstitial cystitis may experience intense penis pain at the moment of ejaculation. Gonorrheal infections are sometimes associated with burning or sharp penile pains during ejaculation. Urethritis or prostatitis can make genital stimulation painful or uncomfortable. Anatomic deformities of the penis, such as exist in Peyronie's disease, may also result in pain during coitus. One cause of painful intercourse is due to the painful retraction of a too-tight foreskin, occurring either during the first attempt at intercourse or subsequent to tightening or scarring following inflammation or local infection. Another cause of painful intercourse is due to tension in a short and slender frenulum, frenulum breve, as the foreskin retracts on entry to the vagina irrespective of lubrication. In one study frenulum breve was found in 50% of patients who presented with dyspareunia. During vigorous or deep or tight intercourse or masturbation, small tears may occur in the preputial frenulum and can bleed and be very painful and induce anxiety, which can become chronic if left unresolved. If stretching fails to ease the condition, and uncomfortable levels of tension remain, a frenuloplasty procedure may be recommended. Frenuloplasty is an effective procedure, with a high chance of avoiding circumcision, giving good functional results and patient satisfaction. The psychological effects of these conditions, while little understood, are real, and are visible in literature and art.

Diagnosis

Differential diagnosis 
Dyspareunia is a condition that has many causes and is not a diagnosis of itself. It is combined with vaginismus into genito-pelvic pain/penetration disorder in the DSM-5. Criteria for genito-pelvic pain/penetration disorder include multiple episodes of difficulty with vaginal penetration, pain associated with intercourse attempts, anticipation of pain due to attempted intercourse, and tensing of the pelvis in response to attempted penetration. To meet criteria for this disorder, a patient must experience the symptoms for at least six months and experience "significant distress".

The differential diagnosis for dyspareunia is long because of its complicated and multifactorial nature. Often there are physiologic conditions underlying the pain, as well as psychosocial components that must be assessed to find appropriate treatment. A differential diagnosis of underlying physical causes can be guided by whether the pain is deep or superficial:
 Superficial dyspareunia or vulvar pain: infection, inflammation, anatomic causes, tissue destruction, psychosocial factors, muscular dysfunction
 Superficial dyspareunia without visible exam findings: When no other physical cause is found the diagnosis of vulvodynia should be considered. Vaginal atrophy may also not be seen clearly on exam but commonly affects postmenopausal patients and is generally associated with estrogen deficiency.
 Deep dyspareunia or pelvic pain: endometriosis, ovarian cysts, pelvic adhesions, inflammatory diseases (interstitial cystitis, pelvic inflammatory disease), infections, congestion, psychosocial factors,

Treatment 
The treatment for pain with intercourse depends on what is causing the pain. After proper diagnosis one or more treatments for specific causes may be necessary.

For example:
 For pain due to yeast or fungal infections, a clinician may prescribe mycogen cream (nystatin and triamcinolone acetonide), which treats both a yeast infection and associated painful inflammation and itching because it contains both an antifungal and a steroid.
 For pain that is likely due to post-menopausal vaginal dryness, estrogen treatment can be used.
 For patients with diagnostic criteria for endometriosis, medications or surgery are possible options.
In addition, the following may reduce discomfort with intercourse:
 Clearly explain to the patient what has happened, including identifying sites and causes of pain. Make clear that the pain, in almost all cases, disappears over time, or at least greatly lessens. If there is a partner, explain the causes and treatment and encourage them to be supportive.
 Encourage the patient to learn about her body, explore her own anatomy and learn how she likes to be caressed and touched.
 Encourage the couple to add pleasant, sexually exciting experiences to their regular interactions, such as bathing together (in which the primary goal is not cleanliness), or mutual caressing without intercourse. Such activities tend to increase both natural lubrication and vaginal dilation, both of which decrease friction and pain. Prior to intercourse, oral sex may relax and lubricate the vagina (provided both partners are comfortable with it).
 For those who have pain on deep penetration because of pelvic injury or disease, recommend a change in coital position to one with less penetration, such as missionary position. A device has also been described for limiting penetration.
 Recommend water-soluble sexual or surgical lubricant during intercourse. Discourage petroleum jelly. Lubricant should be liberally applied (two tablespoons full) to both the penis and the orifice. A folded bath towel under the receiving partner's hips helps prevent spillage on bedclothes.
 Instruct the receiving partner to take the penis of the penetrating partner in their hand and control insertion themselves, rather than let the penetrating partner do it.

History 
The word "dyspareunia" comes from Greek δυσ-, dys- "bad" and πάρευνος, pareunos "bedfellow", meaning "badly mated". The previous Diagnostic and Statistical Manual of Mental Disorders, the DSM-IV, stated that the diagnosis of dyspareunia is made when the patient complains of recurrent or persistent genital pain before, during, or after sexual intercourse that is not caused exclusively by lack of lubrication or by vaginal spasm (vaginismus).  After the text revision of the fourth edition of the DSM, a debate arose, with arguments to recategorize dyspareunia as a pain disorder instead of a sex disorder, with Charles Allen Moser, a physician, arguing for the removal of dyspareunia from the manual altogether. The most recent version, the DSM 5, has grouped dyspareunia under the diagnosis of Genito-Pelvic Pain/Penetration Disorder.

See also
 Dysorgasmia
 Sexual headache

References 

 ''The original text for this article is taken from a public domain CDC document PDF).

Further reading 
 Sandra Risa Leiblum Sexual Pain Disorders - Dyspareunia

External links 

Noninflammatory disorders of female genital tract
Sexual dysfunctions
Pain